Percy Wenrich (January 23, 1880 – March 17, 1952) was an American composer of ragtime and popular music.

Personal life and career
Born in Joplin, Missouri to Daniel Wenrich and Mary Ray, he left for Chicago in 1901 where he attended classes at the Chicago Musical College. Wenrich moved on to New York City around 1907 to work as a Tin Pan Alley composer, but his music retains a Missouri folk flavor. He composed at least eighteen rags, including "Ashy Africa," "Noodles," "Peaches and Cream" (1905), "Crab Apples," and "The Smiler" (1907). His songs include "Wabash Avenue After Dark" and the hits "Put on Your Old Grey Bonnet" (1909, lyrics by Stanley Murphy), "When You Wore a Tulip and I Wore a Big Red Rose" (1914, lyrics by Jack Mahoney) and "Minnetonka" (1921, lyrics by Gus Kahn).

"If It's Good Enough for Washington, It's Good Enough for Me" (1908, lyrics by Ren Shields) was a song about a homeless man sleeping on a bench in a public square with statues of Washington, Jefferson, McKinley, Grant and Lee.

Wenrich married vaudeville performer Dolly Connolly and in 1911 wrote the hit "Red Rose Rag" for her with lyrics by Edward Madden. In 1912, Wenrich and Madden had another hit with "Moonlight Bay."  Wenrich and Connolly toured together for many years. In 1918, Wenrich joined The Lambs Club.

In the late 1930s, Wenrich and several of his fellow hitmakers formed a sensational review called "Songwriters on Parade", performing all across the Eastern seaboard on the Loew's and Keith circuits.

Wenrich's last memorable song "Sail Along, Silv'ry Moon" was published in 1937. He died in New York City in 1952 at the age of 72.

Songs 
 1915 Mothers Must Pay for All (with Jack Mahoney)
 1917 Where Do We Go from Here? (with Howard Johnson)
 1918 I Ain't Got Weary Yet (with Howard Johnson)
 1918 Lambs Gambol (with William Jerome & J. F. Mahoney)
 1918 You Can Tell That He's an American (with Howard Johnson)
 1918 Rainbow from the U.S.A., A. (with William Jerome & J. F. Mahoney)
 1919 By the Camp Fire (with Mabel Elizabeth Girling)
 1919 Casey (with John B. Kennedy)

See also

 List of ragtime composers

References

External links
 Biography Percy Wenrich, "The Joplin Kid", Parlor Songs.
 The Music of Percy Wenrich, part 1, Parlor Songs.
The Music of Percy Wenrich, part 2, Parlor Songs.

 
 audio early 20th century recordings of Wenrich compositions at the Library of Congress jukebox
 Percy Wenrich recordings at the Discography of American Historical Recordings.

1880s births
1952 deaths
American male composers
American composers
People from Joplin, Missouri
Ragtime composers
20th-century American male musicians